Koolivayal is a small town situated near Panamaram in Wayanad, Kerala, India. Its economy is based on agriculture.

Important buildings
Imam Ghazzali Academy (IGA)
Sign Institute of Social Leadership
Nanma charitable, welfare and educational trust
Co-operative Bank
Hujjathul Islam Madrassa
The Grand Koolivayal Mosque
Keloth House Koolivayal(Kalathil)
Kunnoth House Koolivayal

Transportation
Koolivayal can be accessed from Mananthavady or Kalpetta. The Periya ghat road connects Mananthavady to Kannur and Thalassery. The Thamarassery mountain road connects Calicut with Kalpetta. The Kuttiady mountain road connects Vatakara with Kalpetta and Mananthavady. The Palchuram mountain road connects Kannur and Iritty with Mananthavady. The road from Nilambur to Ooty is also connected to Wayanad through the village of Meppadi.

The nearest railway station is at Mysore and the nearest airports are Kozhikode International Airport-120 km, Bengaluru International Airport-290 km, and  Kannur International Airport, 58 km.

References

Villages in Wayanad district
Mananthavady Area